Mark Torrance (born 6 April 1989 in Edinburgh, Scotland) is a Scottish footballer. He is a midfielder.

External links

1989 births
Living people
Scottish footballers
Scottish Football League players
Livingston F.C. players
Cowdenbeath F.C. players
F.C. Edinburgh players
Craigroyston F.C. players
Haddington Athletic F.C. players
Tynecastle F.C. players
Association football midfielders